Dinky Duck is a Terrytoons cartoon character who first appeared in the 1939 animated short The Orphan Duck. Unlike fellow Terrytoons characters Mighty Mouse, silly Gandy Goose and the magpie duo Heckle and Jeckle, Dinky never became popular, appearing in a total of only 15 cartoons between 1939 and 1957.

For most of his appearances, Dinky was a young black duck who lived on a farm with other ducks, chickens and other typical farm animals. Sometimes he was an orphan who simply wanted a place to call home; on other occasions, he would perform some heroic deed and help restore calm to the barnyard when adult animals quarreled. 

The early Dinky Duck cartoons presents Dinky making a sharp quacking noise, while the later ones gave a young voice to Dinky, performed by actor Allen Swift. Several of the cartoons had a singing chorus that gave an introduction to the upcoming story.

Dinky's final appearance was in It's a Living, a CinemaScope cartoon, in which he sheds his cute farmyard duck persona and instead takes on the role of a disgruntled animation actor who quits his cartoon character job to try his hand in television commercial acting.

Dinky was going to have a cameo in Who Framed Roger Rabbit, but rights to the character could not be obtained in time.

Dinky was a supporting character in the 1999 pilot Curbside. He was voiced by Dee Bradley Baker in that version.

References

External links
Dinky Duck at Don Markstein's Toonopedia. Archived from the original on September 9, 2015.
 Dinky Duck Cartoon Philmography at The Big Cartoon Database
 The Orphan Duck, 1939 cartoon (first animation where this character featured)

Fictional ducks
Fictional orphans
Terrytoons characters
Film characters introduced in 1939
Child characters in animated films
Male characters in animation